The following is a list of the 207 communes of the Loire-Atlantique department of France.

The communes cooperate in the following intercommunalities (as of 2020):
Nantes Métropole
Communauté d'agglomération Clisson Sèvre et Maine Agglo
Communauté d'agglomération Pornic Agglo Pays de Retz
Communauté d'agglomération de la Presqu'île de Guérande Atlantique (partly)
CA Redon Agglomération (partly)
Communauté d'agglomération de la Région Nazairienne et de l'Estuaire
Communauté de communes Châteaubriant-Derval
Communauté de communes d'Erdre et Gesvres
Communauté de communes Estuaire et Sillon
Communauté de communes de Grand Lieu
Communauté de communes de Nozay
Communauté de communes du Pays d'Ancenis (partly)
Communauté de communes du Pays de Pont-Château - Saint-Gildas-des-Bois
Communauté de communes de la Région de Blain
Communauté de communes Sèvre et Loire
Communauté de communes du Sud Estuaire
Communauté de communes Sud Retz Atlantique

References

Loire-Atlantique